Fear of Clowns 2 is a 2007 American horror film written and directed by Kevin Kangas. It's a sequel to Fear of Clowns and  takes place two years after the events of the original and continues the story of a young woman (Jacky Reres) getting stalked by a killer clown (Mark Lassise).

Plot
The film begins two years after the events of the first film, with Detective Peters at the Doctor's office, who reveals to Peters that he has Creutzfeldt–Jakob disease (CJD), and there is no treatment; it's fatal.

Two months later, it is revealed that after being sent to jail two years ago, Doug Richardson a.k.a. "Shivers The Clown" was sent to a mental asylum, and Lynn Blodgett has quit her painting career and gone on to write a book called Coulrophobia, which talks about her fear of clowns and the story about the stalking killer clown two years ago; she and Tucker Reid have broken up and haven't seen each other for a while.

But things go terribly wrong: An orderly named Ralph helps Shivers and two other inmates escape the asylum. Shivers takes Ralph and the inmates back to his old house, which is now occupied by a junkie, who is later strangled to death by Shivers. The next day, after hearing of Shiver's escape, Lynn calls Detective Peters and tells him that she will be home soon. Meanwhile, the junkie's friends arrive at the house, only to be killed by the inmates, Giggles The Clown and Ogre The Clown.

Meanwhile, Lynn arrives back home and meets Detective Peters at a restaurant, where he reveals that he's going to kill Doug Richardson. As Detective Peters takes Lynn home, they find out that Shivers has just killed Tucker outside an amusement park, where Tucker was constructing a new design for a roller coaster. Peters then calls two police officers to guard Lynn's house before they leave at 9:00 to secluded cabins in the woods. Before they leave, Ogre kills the police officers, while Shivers tries to kill Lynn. But during the process, Shivers kills Giggles instead.

Peters and Lynn escape through the cellar, while Shivers takes off in the van (where Ralph is handcuffed), leaving Ogre behind to mourn over Giggle's dead body, as he was Ogre's best friend. Ogre then takes off to go after Shivers for revenge. The next day, Peters and Lynn arrive at the cabins, where they are greeted by Hot Rod, Stoltz, and Rego, who are all friends of Peters. Meanwhile, Shivers leaves Ralph in the van while he goes to the bathroom, and Ralph calls an anonymous person, telling him that he needs to pay him (Ralph) more money if he (the caller) wants the job to be done. Then, Shivers leaves to go find Lynn, only to end up at the Horner's home, killing the entire family. Shivers then continues on to find the cabins.

Peters goes outside to see if the coast is clear, only to be axed in the side. Lynn takes off into the woods with Shivers on her tail, leaving the axe inside Peters. Peters, who is still alive, reloads his gun and drags himself to where Lynn and Shivers ran off to. Peters finds them, and shoots Shivers two times: once in the hand, the other in the back, and Shivers falls into a gully. Lynn goes to check to see if Peters is okay, but looks to see Shivers rise up out of the gully. Lynn takes Peter's gun and points it at Shivers, but before she can pull the trigger, Stoltz (who was only injured in the face) pops out of nowhere and shoots Shivers three times in the chest, knocking him back into the gully. It is never revealed whether Peters is dead, or he's just simply unconscious.

The police arrive, only to find out that there's no body in the gully, only that there is a trail of blood that leads a hundred feet south, where Shivers climbed out of the gully and went into the woods. Sgt. Raup (Vincent T. Brown) decides to break the news to Lynn in the morning after she gets a good night sleep. The ending leaves it ambiguous as to whether Shivers is alive, or he died after heading out into the woods.

Cast
Jacky Reres  as Lynn Blodgett
Mark Lassise  as Shivers The Clown
Frank A. Lama  as Detective Peters
Tom Proctor  as Rego
Phillip Levine  as Giggles The Clown
Clarence McNatt  as Ogre The Clown
Johnny Alonso  as Ralph
Adam Ciesielski  as Hot Rod
Savannah Costello  as Maggie
Lars Stevens  as Stoltz
Leanna Chamish  as Carol
John C. Bailey  as Doctor Jones
Vincent T. Brown  as Sgt. Raup
Dave "Bullet" Wooters  as Old Man Horner
Michelle Trout  as Mrs. Horner
Mike Baldwin  as Craig
Chris O'Brocki  as Owen
Jay McCarey  as Officer Ripley
Rob Stull  as Officer Rickenhouse
Steve Carson  as Officer Stewie

Reception

Steve Pattee from HorrorTalk.com awarded the film 3.5/5 stars, writing, "With Fear of Clowns 2, Kevin Kangas has pulled off something that is pretty damn hard to do — he made a sequel that is better than the original... It's got more action, more tension, stronger acting and a killer score. And if one were to judge by the applause and hoots and hollers from the audience, he's got himself a winner."
Fangoria noted that the film was an improvement of the first film, with steadier performances and creepy imagery. However, they criticized the ending as "dissatisfying", and felt that some scenes were drawn out too much.

References

External links
 
 

2007 films
2007 horror films
American sequel films
American slasher films
Fictional clowns
Horror films about clowns
2000s English-language films
Films directed by Kevin Kangas
2000s American films